Dakina Dakina Mal is a 2010 Sri Lankan Sinhala romantic film directed by V. Sivadasan and produced by Sunil T. Fernando for Sunil T. Films. It stars Roger Seneviratne and Semini Iddamalgoda in lead roles along with Roshan Pilapitiya and Damitha Abeyratne. Music composed by Somapala Rathnayake and Mohan Raj. It is the 1165th Sri Lankan film in the Sinhala cinema. It is a remake of 2007 Kollywood film Pachaikili Muthucharam which itself was remake of English movie Derailed (2005 film).

Cast
 Roger Seneviratne as Kumar
 Semini Iddamalgoda as Chamathka
 Damitha Abeyratne as Mandakini
 Roshan Pilapitiya as Aravinda
 Udeni Alwis
 Nilanthi Dias
 Sahan Wijesinghe
 Kapila Sigera
 Sarath Silva
 Hemantha Iriyagama

Soundtrack

References

2010 films
2010s Sinhala-language films
Remakes of Sri Lankan films